Duchess of Montrose is the title given to the wife of the Duke of Montrose. It has been held by several women, including:

Caroline Graham, Duchess of Montrose (1770-1847)
Caroline Graham, Duchess of Montrose, also called Duchess of Montrose (Mr Manton) (1818–1894)
Violet Graham, Duchess of Montrose (1854-1940)
Catherine Graham, Duchess of Montrose (1935-2014)